Evaldo Cruz (born 12 January 1945), known as Evaldo, is a retired Brazilian footballer.

References

1945 births
Living people
Brazilian footballers
Association football forwards
Fluminense FC players
People from Campos dos Goytacazes
Pan American Games medalists in football
Pan American Games gold medalists for Brazil
Footballers at the 1963 Pan American Games
Medalists at the 1963 Pan American Games
Sportspeople from Rio de Janeiro (state)